Claus Roxin (born 15 May 1931 in Hamburg) is a German jurist. He is one of the most influential dogmatists of German penal law and has gained national and international reputation in this field. He has been awarded an honorary doctorate by 27 universities around the world as well as the Bundesverdienstkreuz first class.

Academic life 
Roxin studied law at the University of Hamburg from 1950 to 1954. Afterwards he worked as scientific assistant for professor Henkel where in 1957 he received a doctor's degree for his thesis Offene Tatbestände und Rechtspflichtmerkmale (open elements of a crime and attributes of statutory duty). In 1962 he habilitated with Täterschaft und Teilnahme (crime and accessory to crime) which became a standard work in this field.

Roxin went on to become a professor at Georg-August-Universität Göttingen in 1963. In 1966 he was one of the authors of the "Alternativentwurf für den Allgemeinen Teil des deutschen Strafgesetzbuchs" (alternative proposal for the general part of the German criminal law) which influenced German criminal law for years to come. From 1968 to 1971 he also worked on the alternative proposal for the special part of the German criminal law which was released in four volumes.

In 1971, he became a professor at Ludwig Maximilian University of Munich where he lectured until 1999 and held the chair for penal law, criminal procedure and general legal doctrine. Afterwards he worked in a workshop of German and Swiss jurists which published an alternative proposal of the German Strafvollzugsgesetz (penal system law) in 1973 and an alternative proposal to the German Strafprozessordnung (code of criminal procedure) in 1980.

In the 1970s he was a frequent guest on the ZDF show Wie würden Sie entscheiden? that made him known to a wider audience. He is one of the publishers of the "Zeitschrift für die gesamte Strafrechtswissenschaft" and the  "Neue Zeitschrift für Strafrecht". In 1994 he became a member of the Bavarian Academy of Sciences and Humanities.

Private life
Roxin is also the founder and honorary chairman of the Karl-May-Gesellschaft as well as a recipient of the Bundesverdienstkreuz first class. Roxin is married with three children and lives in Stockdorf.

Academic work
Roxin is the author of multiple books, essays and annotations. Amongst them are:
 Offene Tatbestände und Rechtspflichtmerkmale. 2nd edition. Verlag Cram, de Gruyter & Co., Hamburg 1970.
 Täterschaft und Tatherrschaft. 8th edition. Verlag de Gruyter, Hamburg 2006.
 Strafrecht, Allgemeiner Teil, Band I: Grundlagen. Der Aufbau der Verbrechenslehre. 4th edition. Verlag C. H. Beck, München 2006.
 Strafrecht, Allgemeiner Teil, Band II: Besondere Erscheinungsformen der Straftat. Verlag C. H. Beck, München 2003.
 Karl May, das Strafrecht und die Literatur. in: Jahrbuch der Karl-May-Gesellschaft 1978, S. 9-36.

Books about Roxin
 Bernd Schünemann (ed.): Festschrift für Claus Roxin zum 70. Geburtstag am 15. Mai 2001. Verlag de Gruyter. Berlin, New York 2001, .
 Bernd Schünemann (ed.): Claus Roxin: Person – Werk – Epoche. Centaurus-Verlag. Herbolzheim 2003,  .
 Hans Achenbach: Claus Roxin zum 75. Geburtstag. In: Neue Juristische Wochenschrift 2006, S. 1405.
 Jürgen Wolter et al.: Festgabe für Claus Roxin zum 75. Geburtstag. In: Goltdammer's Archiv für Strafrecht (Heft 5) 2006, S. 255–438.

References

External links

Official homepage
 

1931 births
Living people
German legal scholars
Scholars of criminal law
University of Hamburg alumni
Jurists from Hamburg
Academic staff of the Ludwig Maximilian University of Munich
Academic staff of the University of Göttingen
Officers Crosses of the Order of Merit of the Federal Republic of Germany
Members of the Bavarian Academy of Sciences